Eduardo Corrêa Riedel (born July 5, 1969) is a Brazilian politician who is the 12th and current Governor of Mato Grosso do Sul. A member of the Brazilian Social Democracy Party, he previously served as the 27th Secretary of State for Infrastructure and Housing in Mato Grosso do Sul from 2021 to 2022 under Government Reinaldo Azambuja and 20th Secretary of State for Government and Strategic Management of Mato Grosso do Sul from 2015 to 2021.

Born in Rio de Janeiro, Brazil, on July 5, 1969, son of Seila Garcia Côrrea and Nelson Riedel, he graduated from the Federal University of Rio de Janeiro, the Getúlio Vargas Foundation and the European Institute of Business Administration.

He was Secretary of State for Infrastructure of Mato Grosso do Sul from February 22, 2021 to April 2, 2022. Riedel was president of the Maracaju, Mato Grosso do Sul Union in 1999 and vice-president of the Federation of Agriculture and Livestock of Mato Grosso do Sul, and was also director of the National Confederation of Agriculture (CNA). Between 2012 and 2014 he was president of Famasul, shortly after, he held the position of Secretary of State for Government and Strategic Management of Mato Grosso do Sul, during the government of Reinaldo Azambuja, a position in which he remained until 2021. In July 2021, he was appointed by Reinaldo Azambuja, as chairman of the Management Committee of the Economy Health and Safety Program (Proseguir).

In 2022, he ran in the state elections in Mato Grosso do Sul as a candidate for governor with José Carlos Barbosa (also known as Barbosinha) as his running mate on his gubernatorial ticket.

Career

Riedel was born in Rio de Janeiro on July 5, 1969, son of Seila Garcia Côrrea and Nelson Riedel.

In 1995, he took over the management of the family's rural property in Maracaju, gaining experience in management. Since then, he has taken on management-related positions.

In 2015, Riedel resigned from the position of president director of Famasul (2012-2014), taking over the head of the State Secretariat for Government and Strategic Management of Mato Grosso do Sul, in the government of Reinaldo Azambuja, a position in which he remained until 2021.

During the COVID-19 pandemic, in 2020, the government of Mato Grosso do Sul, with the support of the Pan American Health Organization, created the Health and Safety Program in the Economy, which aimed to inform data and indicators to society, as well as developing more efficient actions to address the impacts of Covid-19 in the state of Mato Grosso do Sul.

To coordinate and manage this project, Governor Reinaldo Azambuja appointed in July 2021, Riedel as president of the Steering Committee of the Health and Safety Program for the Economy.

Candidate for the government of Mato Grosso do Sul

In 2022, he ran in state elections in Mato Grosso do Sul as a candidate for governor, with  José Carlos Barbosa (also known as Barbosinha) as his candidate for Vice governor. On October 2, 2022, during the first round of the election, he obtained 361,981 votes (25.16%) and was qualified to a second round with the candidate Renan Contar. On October 30, 2022 he defeated Contar after obtaining 808,210 votes (56.90%) and was elected as the governor of Mato Grosso do Sul, succeeding Reinaldo Azambuja.

Governor of Mato Grosso do Sul 

On December 6, 2022, Riedel had announced that some names would remain in his government's secretariat, names from the former Azambuja government.

On December 13, 2022, he officially announced the names of the state secretaries who will take office on January 1, 2023. Riedel's first echelon was already closed the week before the announcement.

His inauguration took place on January 1, 2023 at the Legislative Assembly of Mato Grosso do Sul.

Controversies 
In a live broadcast on August 5, 2020, Riedel had taken a position against the judicial request made by the Public Defender's Office , for a lockdown to be determined in Campo Grande during the COVID-19 pandemic. The request, a public action, gave the city hall 72 hours to take a stand.

Riedel also highlighted in his speech that "the greatest enemy in the pandemic is the loss of common sense and the ability to dialogue and articulate direct and concrete actions, even if they do not converge", following up with a criticism of the Public Defender's Office.

At one point, the secretary adopted a confused speech by stating that the statement that the State Government defends the lockdown is a mistake, since there was only an orientation to paralyze only activities considered non-essential at the time.

During these years and especially during this period, Riedel implemented the “More Social” program , which serves more than 100,000 families in Mato Grosso do Sul, through a social card with the aid of R$300 per month. Riedel also helped with the implementation of the "CNH MS Social” which pays all the costs of the first driver's license for some citizens.

Among government actions are several established public-private partnerships, such as Infovia Digital, Sanesul, road paving and projects. Riedel also carried out the final stretch of the Pantanal Biopark works, which had its concept expandedm.

Personal life
In 1994 he married Mônica Morais with whom he has two children: Marcela and Rafael.

Electoral history

2022 Mato Grosso do Sul gubernatorial election

References

Brazilian businesspeople
1969 births
Living people
21st-century Brazilian politicians
Governors of Mato Grosso do Sul
Brazilian Social Democracy Party politicians